Antero Paljakka (born 1 August 1969) is a retired Finnish athlete who specialised in the shot put. He represented his country at the 1992 Summer Olympics and 1993 World Championships.

His personal bests in the event are 19.84 metres outdoors (Töysä 1993) and 18.23 metres indoors (Genoa 1992).

International competitions

References

1969 births
Living people
Finnish male shot putters
World Athletics Championships athletes for Finland
Athletes (track and field) at the 1992 Summer Olympics
Olympic athletes of Finland
People from Kouvola
Sportspeople from Kymenlaakso
20th-century Finnish people
21st-century Finnish people